Jones and Beach station is a streetcar station in the Fisherman's Wharf district of  San Francisco, California, serving as the terminus of the San Francisco Municipal Railway's E Embarcadero and F Market & Wharves heritage railway lines. It is located on Jones Street between Beach and Jefferson Streets. The station opened on March 4, 2000, with the streetcar's extension to Fisherman's Wharf.

The stop is served by the  bus route, which provides service along the F Market & Wharves and L Taraval lines during the late night hours when trains do not operate.

References

External links 

SFMTA: Jones St & Beach St
SFBay Transit (unofficial): Jones St & Beach St

San Francisco Municipal Railway streetcar stations
Fisherman's Wharf, San Francisco
Railway stations in the United States opened in 2000